The British Academy Television Award for Best Current Affairs is one of the major categories of the British Academy Television Awards (BAFTAs), the primary awards ceremony of the British television industry. According to the BAFTA website, the category is "for single films, or films from a strand that are primarily concerned with unfolding current affairs"

The category has been awarded as one category merged with the Best News Coverage category under several names, from 1978 to 1985 and also in 1992 it was presented as Best Actuality Coverage while from 1993 to 1994 and then from 1998 to 2001 it was presented as Best News and Current Affairs Journalism. Finally, the category has been presented as Best Current Affairs since 2002.

Winners and nominees

2000s

2010s

2020s

Note: The series that don't have recipients on the tables had Production team credited as recipients for the award or nomination.

References

External links
List of winners at the British Academy of Film and Television Arts

Current Affairs